Salty liquorice, salmiak liquorice or salmiac liquorice, is a variety of liquorice flavoured with the ingredient "salmiak salt" (sal ammoniac; ammonium chloride), and is a common confection found in the Nordic countries, Benelux, and northern Germany. Salmiak salt gives salty liquorice an astringent, salty taste, akin to that of tannins—a characteristic of red wines, which adds bitterness and astringency to the flavour. Consuming salmiak liquorice can stimulate either a savoury or non-savoury palate and response. Anise oil can also be an additional main ingredient in salty liquorice. Extra-salty liquorice is additionally coated with salmiak salt or salmiak powder, or sometimes table salt.

Salty liquorice candy and pastilles are almost always black or very dark brown and can range from soft candy to hard pastille variety, and sometimes hard brittle. The other colours used are white and variants of grey. Salty liquorice or salmiak is also used as a flavouring in other products, such as ice creams, syrups, chewing gum, snus and alcoholic beverages.

History
Sal ammoniac (ammonium chloride) has a history of being used as a cough medicine, as it works as an expectorant. Finnish author Jukka Annala speculates that salty liquorice has its origins in pharmacy stores that manufactured their own cough medicine. Where and when ammonium chloride and liquorice were first combined to produce salty liquorice is unclear, but by the 1930s it was produced in Finland, Norway, Denmark, Sweden and the Netherlands as a pastille.

Types
Different languages often refer to salty liquorice as either "salmiak liquorice" (Swedish: Salmiaklakrits; Danish: Salmiaklakrids), or simply "salt liquorice" (Swedish: Saltlakrits; Danish: Saltlakrids). The Dutch refer to it as "zoute drop" or "dubbelzoute drop" (double salted liquorice). In Germany, they are commonly known as salt liquorice (Salzlakritz) candy and salmiak pastilles (Salmiakpastillen) or simply Salmiak, in contrast to sweet liquorice (Süßlakritz) candy. A traditional shape for salty liquorice pastilles is a black diamond-shaped lozenge. In Finnish, it is known as salmiakki.

The strength of the confectionery depends on the amount of food grade ammonium chloride (salmiak salt) used, which varies by country and what's considered a safe amount. In Sweden, for example, the most popular types of salty liquorice contain an average of 7% of ammonium chloride. In 2012, there was a European Union proposal to limit the amount to 0.3%, which was met with wide opposition. Although the European Union now regulates the use of ammonium chloride to 0.3% in most foodstuffs, there is no specific restriction for it in liquorice or ice cream. At a level of up to 7.99% ammonium chloride, salmiak pastilles are considered a "traditionally-applied medicine to assist expectoration in the airways".

An antibacterial effect can be attributed to the neutralization of the slightly acidic ammonium chloride (pH about 5.5) by the relatively alkaline saliva (pH about 7), whereby ammonia is released, which has a disinfecting effect:

Reaction of (ammonium)-ions in base solution to ammonia and water.

Health and safety

Germany and European Union
Before implementation of the current European Union community-wide list of permitted flavouring substances used in food, national food legislation in Germany required that a content from above 2% ammonium chloride (salmiak salt) in salty liquorice, was required to carry the label "Adult Liquorice - Not Children's Liquorice" (Erwachsenenlakritz - Kein Kinderlakritz) on packaging in Germany. When the ingredient content of ammonium chloride (salmiak salt) was between 4.49% and 7.99%, the declaration "extra strong" (extra stark) was also required on packaging. More than 7.99% of ammonium chloride (salmiak salt) was not permitted in Germany at that point in time. Since then, the upper limit on ammonium chloride has been lifted.

Other uses

In addition to being used in candy, salmiak is also used to flavour vodka, chocolate, distilled rye brandy, ice cream, cola drinks, snus, and meat.

Salty liquorice products
 Apteekin Salmiakki, a Finnish brand of salty liquorice candy
 Lakrisal, a salty salmiak candy
 Pantteri/Katten, a Finnish gummy salmiak candy
 Pirate coins Parate or "Piratos" coins, a salty liquorice shaped like coins with pirate motifs
 Salzige Heringe (Salty Herrings), a popular German brand of salmiak liquorice candy shaped like herring, produced by the German candy manufacturer Katjes, currently containing 2% salmiak salt and 6% liquorice root extract (formerly 1.8% salmiak salt and 4.5% liquorice root extract).
 Salmiakki Koskenkorva, a Finnish salmiak-flavoured vodka brand
 Tyrkisk Peber (Turkish pepper), a popular brand of salmiak candy

References

Books

Further reading

External links

 The Finnish Salmiakki Association (in Finnish)
 Descriptions and reviews of many Danish liquorice products (in Danish)
 

Liquorice (confectionery)
Swedish confectionery
Norwegian confectionery
Dutch confectionery
Finnish confectionery
Danish confectionery